Cleckley is a surname. Notable people with the surname include:

 Franklin Cleckley (1940–2017), American jurist
 Hervey M. Cleckley (1903–1984), American psychiatrist